The large moth family Gelechiidae contains the following genera:

Radionerva
Recurvaria
Reichardtiella
Resupina
Reuttia
Rhadinophylla
Rifseria

References

 Natural History Museum Lepidoptera genus database

Gelechiidae
Gelechiid